The Official Publishing Center is an institution of the Albanian government under the direct supervision of the Ministry of Justice. It is responsible for publishing the Official Journal, the Bulletin of Official News and for updating and maintaining the Electronic Archive of Acts and other publications, pursuant to the law "On the organization and functioning of the Official Publishing Center".

QBZ is responsible for the publication of acts, printed publications of updated codes and summaries of legislation (by topic), the safekeeping and non-publication of data, laws and other acts, until they are published in the official journal or the official announcement bulletin.

References 

Law of Albania
Statutory law
Mass media in Tirana
Center
Mass media agencies of Albania